Janet Maguire (1927 - 2019) was an American composer born in Chicago, resided in Venice, Italy.

Biography 
She is known particularly for her arrangement of the finale of Giacomo Puccini's Turandot, in which she exclusively used the sketches Puccini left for it at his death. Maguire is also known for her dramatic contemporary opera in three acts, Hérésie, and has worked in a wide variety of musical expressions throughout some fifty orchestral, chamber, solo, vocal, choral and stage works.

Born in Chicago and raised in New Rochelle, New York, Janet Maguire began musical studies at the age of six: on piano, French horn, and cornet. She completed a BA degree in Piano at Colorado College, then went to Paris to study composition with René Leibowitz for five years. They co-authored the book Thinking for Orchestra: Practical Exercises in Orchestration (published by G. Schirmer), and a book about the orchestration of some of Jacques Offenbach's works, Nuits Parisiennes (RCA, Bote & Bock), as well as Carl Maria von Weber's opera Die Drei Pintos. Several summers spent at the Darmstadt Ferienkurse influenced Maguire's style, as did the music of György Ligeti, Luigi Nono, and Karlheinz Stockhausen.

Maguire continued to develop independent paths in musical thought with the help of several musicians specializing in experimental music.

Maguire was the recipient of the 2008 Guggenheim Fellowship as well as a residence at Copland House in 2006.

Maguire was music critic for the Paris Herald Tribune while she lived in Paris. After moving to Venice, she founded there the association "Musica in Divenire", of which she was elected president, and organized concerts of new music. Her compositions have been heard throughout Italy and Germany, and in France, Spain, Ireland, the UK, the US, Austria, Canada, Argentina, Australia, Latvia and Bulgaria. New World Records issued a CD with seven of her works, and Albany Records released a CD with ten of her works in 2009.

List of works

Orchestral 
 Shuffle (1991)
 La Mia Serra (poem by Luisa Milos) with mezzo-soprano solo and chorus (1992)
 Hark (1995)
 Glass (1997)
 Le Jardin de Versailles (1998)
 Fantasia with  piano solo (1990)
 Etude Osmotique with chorus SATB (2000)

Solo piano 
 Frills (2002)

Piano duet 
 Ebb and Flow (1999)

Piano with orchestra 
 Fantasia (1990)
 Hark (2000)

Piano with chamber ensemble 
 Treize A Table for piano and 12 percussionists
 Quest for piano and 2 percussions
 L'Intervista for piano, soprano, flute, oboe, clarinet, horn, trumpet, violin, viola, cello and percussion
 Tragedy for piano with string quartet

Vocal with ensemble 
 Canzone D'Amore for tenor and 20 strings
 Un Momento for speaker, 2 violins, 2 violas, 2 cellos, 2 percussionists
 Wisp for soprano, 2 flutes, clarinet, bass clarinet, alto sax, horn, piano, violin, viola, cello, double bass
Five Chinese Poems (poems by Joseph A. Precker) for bass voice, cello, clarinet, zheng, 3 percussionists
 Lace Knots for string quartet and soprano
 L'Intervista for soprano
 La Mia Serra (poem by Luisa Milos) for orchestra, chorus, contralto
 Gone, (poem by Carl Sandburg) for mezzo-soprano, flute, viola, harp

Vocal with piano 
 Cosi (poem by Paola Bozzini) for soprano
 Cummings Lieder (poems by e.e. Cummings) for soprano
 Three Love Songs (poems by Joseph A. Precker) for tenor

Chorus 
 Southern Trees (poem by Lewis Allan) for 2 sopranos, mezzo-soprano, alto, with chimes
 Il Fiume Tchirek (poem by Altun the Tartar) for 2 sopranos, mezzo-soprano, alto, 2 tenors, 2 baritones and bass
 Lightly for women's chorus with 2 sopranos, mezzo-soprano, alto,  with tamburello, crotales, guiro, rainstick
 Inno A Dio for SATB chorus
 Per Acqua (poem by Luisa Milos) for two SATB choruses

Piano and voice 
 Cosi (poem by Paola Bozzini) soprano and piano
 Cummings Lieder (poems by e.e. cummings) soprano and piano
 Three Love Songs  (poems by Joseph A. Precker)  piano and tenor

Percussion 
 Treize A Table for 13 percussionists with piano
 Quest for piano and 2 percussionists
 Five Chinese Poems, for 3 percussionists, clarinet, cello, zheng, bass voice
 Moondust, for zheng and 4 percussionists
 Wisp, for soprano, two flutes, clarinet, bass clarinet, soprano sax, horn, piano, violin, viola, cello, double bass, 2 percussionists
 Hier Bin Bin Ich, Wo Bist Du? for two flutes, oboe, 2 clarinets, bassoon, double bassoon, 2 horns, 2 trumpets, trombone, 2 violins, viola, cello, double bass, 4 percussionists
 Un Momento, for two percussions, 2 violins, 2 viola, 2 cellos,  speaker   5'
 L'Intervista, for soprano, flute, oboe, clarinet, horn, trumpet, violin, viola, cello, piano, percussion

Strings

Quartets 
 Invenzione
 L'Altro Quartetto with crotales and bongo
 Lace Knots with soprano
 Fumees d'Ivresse for four cellos

Duos 
 Variations for violin and viola
 Scontri for violin and double bass
 Fingers  for harp and percussion
 Discussion for harp and oboe

Solos 
 Tango for solo violin
 Sketch for solo violin
 Vagheggiando for solo cello
 A Question for solo viola

In ensemble 
 Canzone d'Amore for 20 strings with tenor voice
 Un Momento for 2 violins, 2 violas, 2 cellos, 2 percussionists, speaker
 Danza for 4 violins, 4 violas, 4 cellos, double bass, oboe, clarinet
 2 Chinese poems, (Joseph A. Precker poems) for cello, clarinet, zheng, 3 percussionists, bass voice
 Hier bin Ich, Wo bist Du?  (Konrad Lorenz gewidmet) for large ensemble
 A Trois - flute, clarinet, violin
 L'Intervista for soprano, violin, viola, cello, flute, oboe, clarinet, horn, timpani, xylophone, percussion, piano
 Moondustfor Zheng and 4 percussionists

Winds 
 Miniotto - two clarinets in B

Theatrical 

 Envoys, an  opera-ballet  based on a haiku-play by Richard France
 Taiga, ballet by Paola Bozzini
 Heresie - opera in 3 acts, libretto by Gabrielle Zimmermann in French

Chamber music
 Scontri for violin and double bass
 Invenzione for string quartet
 Miniotto for 3 B clarinets
 Discussion for oboe and harp
 Fumees d'Ivresse for four cellos
 Peacock for mezzo-soprano, violin, viola, cello, flute, clarinet, saxophone
 L'Altro Quartetto for string quartet with bongo and crotales
 L'Intervista for soprano, flute, oboe, clarinet, horn, trumpet, violin, viola, cello, xylophone, percussion, piano
 Danza for oboe, clarinet, four violins, four violas, four cellos, double bass, tamtam
 A Trois for flute, clarinet, violin
 Schizzi for film, two clarinets, bass clarinet, two bassoons, four horns, two trumpets, two trombones, timpani, percussion, harp and strings

Sources 
New World Records, Liner Notes: Recorded Anthology of American Music
Thinking for Orchestra: Practical Exercises in Orchestration, 240 pages, G. Schirmer, Inc. ASIN: B000Z4VKL4(1960)

References

External links 
 

1927 births
20th-century classical composers
21st-century classical composers
American women classical composers
American classical composers
American opera composers
Living people
Musicians from Chicago
Musicians from New Rochelle, New York
Colorado College alumni
American expatriates in Italy
American music critics
American women music critics
21st-century American composers
Women opera composers
Journalists from New York (state)
20th-century American women musicians
20th-century American composers
21st-century American women musicians
Classical musicians from New York (state)
Classical musicians from Illinois
20th-century women composers
21st-century women composers